Mother o' Mine is a 1921 American silent drama film that was directed by Fred Niblo. It written by C. Gardner Sullivan based on the short story "The Octopus" by Charles Belmont Davis. A complete print of the film exists in the Library of Congress as well as its trailer.

Plot
As described in a film publication, several years earlier Mrs. Sheldon (McDowell) had been deserted by her husband. She brought up her son Robert (Hughes) in the belief that his father was dead. His desire to make good in the city leads his mother to send him to his father, Willard Thatcher (Kilgour). Unknown to him, Robert is now working for his own father, and all goes well until he learns of his father's nefarious financial schemes. They end up fighting, and Willard tells Robert that while he is married to his mother, Robert is not his son. Willard is accidentally killed, and on the evidence of Fan Baxter (Blythe), Willard's woman, Robert is condemned. A last minute forced confession from Fan by Robert's mother saves the day.

Cast
 Lloyd Hughes as Robert Sheldon
 Betty Ross Clarke as Dolly Wilson
 Betty Blythe as Fan Baxter
 Joseph Kilgour as Willard Thatcher
 Claire McDowell as Mrs. Sheldon
 Andrew Robson as District Attorney
 Andrew Arbuckle as Henry Godfrey

References

External links

1921 films
1921 drama films
Silent American drama films
American silent feature films
American black-and-white films
Films directed by Fred Niblo
1920s American films